The McDonnell XF-88 Voodoo was a long-range, twinjet fighter aircraft with swept wings designed for the United States Air Force. Although it never entered production, its design was adapted for the subsequent supersonic F-101 Voodoo.

Design and development
The XF-88 originated from a 1946 United States Army Air Forces requirement for a long-range "penetration fighter" to escort bombers to their targets. It was to be essentially a jet-powered replacement for the wartime North American P-51 Mustang that had escorted Boeing B-17 Flying Fortress bombers over Germany. It was to have a combat radius of 900 mi (1,450 km) and high performance. McDonnell began work on the aircraft, dubbed Model 36, on 1 April 1946. On 20 June the company was given a contract for two prototypes designated XP-88. Dave Lewis was Chief of Aerodynamics on this project.

The initial design was intended to have straight wings and a V-shaped tail, but wind tunnel tests indicated aerodynamic problems that led to a conventional tailplane being substituted and the wings being swept. The USAAF confirmed the order for the two prototypes on 14 February 1947, while a change in designation schemes led to the unflown prototypes being re-designated XF-88 on 1 July 1948, with the type gaining the nickname "Voodoo".

The Voodoo had a low/mid-mounted wing, swept to 35°. The two engines, specified as Westinghouse J34 turbojets were in the lower fuselage, fed by air intakes in the wing roots and jetpipes beneath the rear fuselage. This made room in the long fuselage for the fuel tanks required for the required long range. The Voodoo's short nose had no radar, being intended to house an armament of six 20 mm (.79 in) M39 cannon, while the fighter's single pilot sat in a pressurized cockpit and was provided with an ejection seat.

Operational history
The first XF-88 made its maiden flight from Muroc Field on 20 October 1948, piloted by McDonnell Chief Test Pilot Robert Edholm. It was unarmed and powered by non-afterburning J34-13 engines that gave 3,000 lbf (13.37 kN) thrust. While testing demonstrated adequate handling and the required endurance, the XF-88 proved to be underpowered. This resulted in inadequate performance, with its maximum speed of 641 mph being less than the F-86A then in production. In order to improve performance, it was decided to fit the second prototype's engines with McDonnell-designed afterburners. Thus modified, the engines became J34-22s, giving 3,600 lbf (16.05 kN) thrust. The second prototype, XF-88A, made its maiden flight on 26 April 1949, with the first prototype later modified to the same standard.

The afterburners improved the Voodoo's performance, with the XF-88A reaching 700 mph (1,126 km/h) but at the expense of decreased range owing to increased fuel consumption. Despite this, the XF-88 was chosen against the Lockheed XF-90 and North American YF-93 for the USAF's Penetration Fighter requirement, with planned production versions to use more powerful Westinghouse J46 engines. (A 1948 order for 118 F-93s had been cancelled in 1949.) Changes in Air Force priorities, together with a shortage of money, led the penetration fighter to be cancelled in August 1950.

The first prototype was modified to XF-88B standard as a propeller-research vehicle. The model propeller was driven by a nose-mounted Allison T38 turboprop which was used to assist in the climb as well as to reach the test conditions. The aircraft was used to test three propellers through 1956, to speeds slightly exceeding Mach 1.0, the first propeller-equipped aircraft to do so. The propeller was tested in level flight to about M 0.9 with the help of the turbojet afterburners, and to just over M 1.0 in a dive.

McDonnell also proposed a naval version of the XF-88, a two-seat operational trainer, and a reconnaissance variant but none were built.  Both prototypes were scrapped by 1958.

Experience of the Korean War led the USAF to reconsider its plans for penetration fighters and led to a new specification for a long-range fighter, General Operational Requirement (GOR) 101 being issued in February 1951. A considerably enlarged version of the design was chosen to meet this requirement later that year, the revised design becoming the F-101 Voodoo, the first production version of which flew on 29 September 1954.

Operators

United States Air Force

Variants
XF-88
First prototype, powered by 3,000 lbf (13.38 kN) Westinghouse J34-13 engines. Unarmed.
XF-88A
Second prototype, fitted with J-34-22 engines with primitive afterburners. Later fitted with armament.  First prototype also modified to this standard.
XF-88B
Modification of first prototype with 2,500 shp (1,865 kW) Allison XT38 turboprop engine in nose, and retaining its jet engines. First flown 14 April 1953.

Specifications (XF-88A)

See also

References

Notes

Bibliography

 Angelucci, Enzo and Peter Bowers. The American Fighter. Sparkford, Somerset, UK: Haynes Publishing Group, 1987. .
 Dorr, Robert F. "McDonnell F-88/F-101 Variant Briefing". Wings of Fame, Volume 1. London: Aerospace Publishing, 1995. .
Dorr, Robert F. and Donald, David. Fighters of the United States Air Force. London: Temple, 1990. .
 Francillon, René J. McDonnell Douglas Aircraft since 1920. London: Putnam, 1979. .
 Knaack, Marcelle Size. Encyclopedia of US Air Force Aircraft and Missile Systems: Volume 1 Post-World War II Fighters, 1945-1973.. Washington, D.C.: Office of Air Force History, 1978. .
 Peacock, Lindsay. "The One-O-Wonder". Air International, Volume 29, No. 2, August 1985, pp. 75–81, 93–95. ISSN 0306-5634.

F-088 Voodoo
McDonnell F-88 Voodoo
Twinjets
Cancelled military aircraft projects of the United States
XF-88B
Mid-wing aircraft
Aircraft first flown in 1948